The following Forbes list of Lebanese billionaires is based on an annual assessment of wealth and assets compiled and published by Forbes magazine in 2021. This list only takes into account Lebanese still alive.

2021 Forbes Lebanese billionaires list

Billionaires of Lebanese descent

The following list is the ranking of all the identified billionaires of Lebanese descent outside their country as of February 2014.

See also 
List of Lebanese people
List of billionaires

References

Net worth

Lebanese
Economy of Lebanon-related lists